KLTF (960 AM) is a radio station  broadcasting a News Talk Information format. Licensed to Little Falls, Minnesota, United States. It serves the entire Morrison County area. KLTF is located in a studio facility at 16405 Haven Road, with its two sister stations.

The station is currently owned by Little Falls Radio Corporation, and features programming from Cumulus Media, Fox Sports Radio and Salem Communications.

References

External links

Radio stations in Minnesota
News and talk radio stations in the United States
Radio stations established in 1950
1950 establishments in Minnesota